The Ron, Ronic or Ron–Fyer languages, group A.4 of the West Chadic branch of the Afro-Asiatic language family, are spoken in Plateau State, north-central Nigeria.

The Ron languages have undergone extensive influence from Tarok.

Languages
The Ron languages, and their tentative relationships, are:

Ron
Fyer, Tambas
(branch)
Central Ron
Daffo-Mbar-Butura
Bokkos
Monguna (Shagawu) [perhaps actually closer to Sha]
Sha
Mangar
Mundat–Karfa
Mundat
Karfa (Duhwa)
Kulere (Richa)

Blench (2019) groups the following in the (Central) Ron/Run dialect cluster: Bokkos, Mbar, Daffo–Butura, Manguna, Mangar, Sha.

While noting that Ron is in fact a complex linkage, Blench (2003) rejects two of the connections proposed in Seibert (1998) [Sha with Mundat–Karfa and Mangar with Kulere/Richa]:
Northern: Fyer, Tambas
Central: Bokkos, Daffo-Mbar-Butura, Monguna
Western: Sha, Mundat, Karfa
Southern: Richa, Mangar

Names and locations
Below is a comprehensive list of Ron language names, populations, and locations from Blench (2019).

Reconstruction

Since the Ron languages form a diverse linkage, Ron reconstruction is not straightforward due to the lack of neat sound correspondences. There are many borrowings from neighbouring Niger-Congo Plateau languages that Ron had assimilated or been in contact with.

Proto-Ron reconstructions by Roger Blench are as follows.

Morphology
Plurals of nouns in Ron languages are typically formed with -a- infixes.

References

External links
Comparative Ron wordlist by Roger Blench

West Chadic languages
Languages of Nigeria